Trigolo (locally ) is a comune (municipality) in the Province of Cremona in the Italian region Lombardy, located about  southeast of Milan and about  northwest of Cremona.

Trigolo borders the following municipalities: Castelleone, Cumignano sul Naviglio, Fiesco, Salvirola, Soresina.

References

Cities and towns in Lombardy